An airstrike is a military strike by air forces or other military aviation assets against an enemy ground position.

Airstrike may also refer to:

 AeroWings 2: Airstrike, a combat flight simulator
 Airstrike (comics), a fictional character
 Air Strike (1955 film), a Korean War US aviation war film
 Air Strike (2018 film), a WWII US-Chinese aviation war film 
 Airstrike (video game), 1982 video game

See also
 Air (disambiguation)
 Strike (disambiguation)